The Lost River Reservation (also known as the Lost River Gorge & Boulder Caves) is a protected area with a series of caves along a gorge in the White Mountains in Woodstock, New Hampshire, United States.

Description
The Lost River is so-named because the brook draining the southern part of Kinsman Notch disappears below the surface in a narrow, steep-walled glacial gorge. The gorge is partially filled with immense blocks of granite, through the spaces of which the brook cascades along its subterranean course until it eventually emerges and joins the Pemigewasset River, which flows southward from Franconia Notch.

Lost River Reservation protects  around the gorge and is owned by the Society for the Protection of New Hampshire Forests. Admission to the gorge is by fee. There are stairs down to the gorge area, with a  boardwalk along the gorge. Most caves can be walked or crawled into.

The Forest Society maintains two free trails on the Lost River Reservation, which are separate from the gorge area leased to White Mountain Attractions.

References

External links
 
 Society for the Protection of New Hampshire Forests

Caves of New Hampshire
Landforms of Grafton County, New Hampshire
Landmarks in New Hampshire
Nature reserves in New Hampshire
Protected areas of Grafton County, New Hampshire
Tourist attractions in Grafton County, New Hampshire